Flavia Zoccari (born 1 November 1986) is an Italian freestyle swimmer who competed in the 2008 Summer Olympics.

References

1986 births
Living people
Italian female freestyle swimmers
Olympic swimmers of Italy
Swimmers at the 2008 Summer Olympics
Universiade medalists in swimming
Mediterranean Games gold medalists for Italy
Mediterranean Games medalists in swimming
Swimmers at the 2009 Mediterranean Games
Universiade bronze medalists for Italy
Medalists at the 2007 Summer Universiade